During the Japanese-led Nanjing Massacre, the International Red Cross established a contingent in the city to coordinate the humanitarian aid effort.

Members

Activities
Below is listed their responsibilities, and/or their mini-biographies if known and not already linked above:

John Magee

John Magee was an Episcopalian minister and the Red Cross chairman of the Nanking Branch. In his role with the Red Cross, he provided care to the hospitalized wounded, but is also known for filming what he saw on the streets of Nanking, providing documentary evidence to the world.

Minnie Vautrin

Through Minnie Vautrin's efforts, Ginling Girls College became a haven of refuge, at times harboring up to 10,000 women in a college designed to support between 200 and 300. With only her wits and the use of an American flag, Vautrin was able to repel incursions into her college and thereby protected thousands of Chinese women from being raped as she oversaw the refugee camp at Ginling Women's Arts and Science College where she served as the acting president.

James McCallum
James McCallum drove the Drum Tower Hospital ambulance to pick up wounded around the city day and night, fighting to keep himself awake.

Grace Bauer
Grace Bauer worked in the Drum Tower Hospital to help care for the wounded who poured in.

Mary Twinem
Mary Twinem, née Fine, or Mrs. Paul de Witt-Twinem, taught at Kwang-hwa High School, where she was one of Soong Mei-ling's teacher. An American from Trenton, New Jersey, she was later naturalized as a Chinese citizen and considered herself Chinese.

References

External links
   List of members with Chinese names

Nanjing Massacre
Rescue of Chinese in the Nanjing Massacre